Elisabeth de Mariaffi is a Canadian writer, whose debut short story collection How to Get Along With Women was a longlisted nominee for the Scotiabank Giller Prize and a shortlisted nominee for the ReLit Award in 2013.

Her poetry and fiction have been published in literary magazines including CV2, Descant, The Fiddlehead, This Magazine and The New Quarterly. Her first poetry chapbook, Letter on St. Valentine's Day, was published in 2009. She holds an MFA in creative writing from the University of Guelph.

In 2015, she published her debut novel The Devil You Know.

Originally from Toronto, Ontario, she is currently based in St. John's, Newfoundland and Labrador.

References

Canadian women poets
Canadian women novelists
21st-century Canadian poets
21st-century Canadian novelists
Writers from St. John's, Newfoundland and Labrador
Writers from Toronto
Living people
University of Guelph alumni
Canadian women short story writers
21st-century Canadian women writers
21st-century Canadian short story writers
Year of birth missing (living people)